Major Nigel Harvie Bennett (23 September 1913 – 26 July 2008) was an English cricketer.

Bennett was unexpectedly appointed as the county captain of Surrey County Cricket Club in 1946 when the club was still recovering from the Second World War. It is generally believed he was mistaken for the prominent club cricketer and BBC captain, Major Leo Bennett, who was mooted as a likely choice. Leo Bennett later played for Northamptonshire.

Nigel Bennett had played three matches for Surrey Second Eleven in 1936, twice against Kent Second Eleven and once against Wiltshire. He played in 31 first-class matches for Surrey as a right-handed batsman, scoring 688 runs at an average of 16.00 with a highest score of 79. He scored four half-centuries and took six catches. Bennett was "a weak batsman and utterly lost as a county captain", and Surrey slumped to 11th, their worst ever finish. He was replaced by Errol Holmes, who was recalled as captain for the 1947 and 1948 seasons.

Bennett was born at Walton-on-Thames, Surrey and died in Bristol.

References

External links

1912 births
2008 deaths
English cricketers
Surrey cricketers
Surrey cricket captains
People from Walton-on-Thames
Royal Engineers officers
British Army personnel of World War II